Aspicilia mansourii is a species of lichen in the family Megasporaceae. Found in Asia, it was described as new to science in 2011.

References

Lichen species
Lichens described in 2011
Lichens of Asia
Pertusariales